Dr Kevin Beurle (19 January 1956 – 29 May 2009) was a British space scientist and programmer at Queen Mary, University of London, who played a key role in the Cassini–Huygens mission to study Saturn and its moons. He was a specialist in space imaging systems. He was the lead Cassini programmer at QMUL, developing software and designing the spacecraft's observation sequences.

Life
Beurle had one daughter, Angharad, born in 1983, and was a fifth-generation vegetarian. He was a keen scuba diver amongst other water sports. He began formal diving training in 1997 and trained up to the level of PADI Staff Instructor by the time of his death. He was also an enthusiastic mountaineer and skier.

In 2005, Beurle was on the Oval train during the failed 21 July 2005 London bombings.

Death
Beurle died on 29 May 2009 when the hot-air balloon he was riding in collided with another and plummeted 50 m (160 ft) to the ground shortly after take-off in Cappadocia, Turkey. He was the only fatality, though others suffered severe and, in one case, critical injuries.

References

1956 births
2009 deaths
British space scientists
Alumni of Imperial College London
Academics of Queen Mary University of London
People from Streatham
Victims of aviation accidents or incidents in Turkey